Vivekanand Nagar railway station (station code: VVKN) is a railway station on New Delhi–Chennai main line in Nagpur CR railway division of Central Railway Zone of Indian Railways. It serves Vivekanand Nagar and Wadgaon, a suburb of Chandrapur, in Chandrapur district in Maharashtra State in India. It is located at 189 m above sea level and has no platform. Only passenger trains stop at this station.

References

External links
Vivekanand Nagar

Railway stations in Chandrapur district
Nagpur CR railway division